The 1976 Individual Long Track World Championship was the sixth edition of the FIM speedway Individual Long Track World Championship. The event was held on 12 September 1976 in Mariánské Lázně, Czech Republic which was Czechoslovakia at the time.

The world title was won by Ivan Mauger of New Zealand for a third time.

Final Classification 

Key
 E = eliminated (no further ride)
 f = fell
 e.f = engine failure

References 

1976
Sport in Czechoslovakia
Speedway competitions in the Czech Republic
Sports competitions in Czechoslovakia
Motor
Motor